USS Eversole (DE-404) was a  built for the United States Navy during World War II.  Named for Lieutenant (junior grade) John Thomas Eversole, (a naval aviator who was killed in the opening phases of the Battle of Midway), she was the first of two U.S. Naval vessels to bear the name. The vessel was torpedoed and sunk on 28 October 1944.

Construction and commissioning
Eversole was laid down on 15 September 1943 by Brown Shipbuilding of Houston, Texas and launched on 3 December, sponsored by Mrs. Sarah R. Eversole, mother of Lieutenant (junior grade) Eversole. The ship was commissioned on 21 March 1944.

Operational history
Eversole sailed from Boston 20 May 1944 for Pearl Harbor, arriving 19 June. After training with submarines in the Hawaiian Islands, she made an escort voyage to Eniwetok, then sailed to Eniwetok and Manus on escort duty. She returned to Eniwetok for antisubmarine patrols until 9 August, when she put to sea screening carriers for the attack on Morotai. She continued this duty, serving with the escort carriers in the initial assaults in Leyte Gulf on 20 October.

After the Battle of Leyte Gulf, Eversole rescued downed pilots, screened two of the damaged escort carriers, and took wounded off one of the carriers. In the early morning of 28 October, Eversole made contact by sonar with a submarine, and half a minute later suffered the first of two torpedo hits. The ship was ordered abandoned. After the men were all in the water, the submarine surfaced and opened fire, then dived once more. Five minutes later there was a tremendous underwater explosion which killed or wounded some of Eversoles crew. Lights from the survivors' flashlights attracted two other escorts, one of which rescued the 139 wounded survivors, as the other began a series of attacks which sank , presumably the Japanese submarine which had torpedoed Eversole.

Honors
Eversole received two battle stars for World War II service. Over 40 of her crew were lost with the ship.

See also
 See List of US Navy ships sunk or damaged in action during World War II for other Navy ships lost in World War II.

References

External links
NavSource.org - DE-404

John C. Butler-class destroyer escorts
World War II frigates and destroyer escorts of the United States
Ships sunk by Japanese submarines
World War II shipwrecks in the Pacific Ocean
Ships built in Houston
1943 ships
Maritime incidents in October 1944